United Nations Security Council Resolution 2052 was unanimously adopted on 27 June 2012.

See also 
List of United Nations Security Council Resolutions 2001 to 2100

References

External links
Text of the Resolution at undocs.org

2012 United Nations Security Council resolutions
2012 in Israel
2012 in Syria
United Nations Security Council resolutions concerning Israel
 2052
June 2012 events